Khlong San station is a Gold Line station, located in Khlong San District, Bangkok, Thailand. It is located in front of Taksin Hospital. The station is on Somdet Chao Phraya Road and opened on 16 December 2020.

See also 
 Gold Line (Bangkok)

References 

Bangkok rapid transit stations